is a Japanese former professional ice hockey defenceman.

Throughout the entirety of his professional career, Osawa played for the Nippon Paper Cranes of Asia League Ice Hockey, from 2001 until his retirement in 2016. He also played for the Japan national team from 2005 to 2011.

External links
 
 Nippon Paper Cranes player profile 

1979 births
People from Tomakomai, Hokkaido
Japanese ice hockey defencemen
Living people
Sportspeople from Hokkaido
Nippon Paper Cranes players
Asian Games gold medalists for Japan
Asian Games silver medalists for Japan
Medalists at the 2007 Asian Winter Games
Medalists at the 2011 Asian Winter Games
Ice hockey players at the 2007 Asian Winter Games
Ice hockey players at the 2011 Asian Winter Games
Asian Games medalists in ice hockey